On My Block is an American teen comedy-drama streaming television series, created by Lauren Iungerich, Eddie Gonzalez, and Jeremy Haft. The first season, consisting of ten episodes, was released on Netflix on March 16, 2018. On April 13, 2018, the series was renewed for a second season and it premiered on March 29, 2019. On April 29, 2019, the series was renewed for a third season which premiered on March 11, 2020. On January 29, 2021, the series was renewed for a fourth and final season which premiered on October 4, 2021.

The series stars Sierra Capri, Jason Genao, Brett Gray, Diego Tinoco, and Jessica Marie Garcia. The series's diverse cast, story-lines, and performances were praised by critics.

Premise
In a rough inner-city Los Angeles neighborhood, called Freeridge, four teens find their lifelong friendship tested as they begin high school.

Cast and characters

Main

 Sierra Capri as Monsé Finnie, a headstrong Afro-Latina tomboy, who serves as the leader of her friend group. Raised by her single father, she is in love with one of her best friends, Cesar.
 Jason Genao as Ruben "Ruby" Martinez Jr., a smart-aleck math whiz of Mexican descent often serving as the group's conscience
 Brett Gray as Jamal Turner, the nerd of the group, who is African-American. In season 1, he is drawn into finding a hidden treasure scheme surrounding RollerWorld.
 Diego Tinoco as Cesar Diaz, an intelligent Latino teen forced into gang life once his brother is released from prison, putting a strain on a blossoming relationship with Monsé
 Jessica Marie Garcia as Jasmine Flores (seasons 2–4; recurring season 1), a classmate of the group, who has a romantic obsession with Ruby. She and Ruby start a relationship during Season 3.
Julio Macias as Oscar "Spooky" Diaz (seasons 3–4; recurring seasons 1–2), Cesar's older brother and a high-level member of the Santos gang
 Peggy Blow as Marisol Martinez 'Abuelita' (season 4; recurring season 1–3), Ruby's grandmother

Recurring
 Ronni Hawk as Olivia (season 1), a friend of Ruby's family who moves in with them after her parents are deported, and Ruby's love interest. She is shot by Latrelle and dies in the season 1 finale.
 Jahking Guillory as Latrelle (season 1–2; guest season 4), a former classmate of the group and a member of the Prophet$, a longtime rival gang to the Santos
 Emilio Rivera as Chivo (season 1–2, 4), (season 3, voice only), a gardener and former Santos gang member caught up in Jamal's hidden treasure scheme
 Paula Garcés as Geny Martinez, Ruby's mother
 Eric Neil Gutierrez as Ruben Martinez, Ruby's father
 Danny Ramirez as Mario Martinez (season 1–2), Ruby's older brother
 Kylie Samaniego as Luisa Martinez (season 1–2), Ruby's little sister
 Julian Lerma as Luis Martinez (season 1–2), Ruby's little brother
 Reggie Austin as Monty Finnie, Monsé's father. A truck driver, mostly on the road away from Monsé to work
 Lisa Marcos as Selena "Julia" Whitman (season 1–2), Monsé's biological mother who left at a young age, and reconnected with in season 2
 Eme Ikwuakor as Dwayne Turner, Jamal's father. Former Freeridge High School football player and owner of Dwayne's Joint, a local restaurant
 Raushanah Simmons as Mrs. Turner, Jamal's mother
 Rob Murat as Coach Ron (season 1–2, 4), the Freeridge High School football coach and Sex Ed teacher
 Angela Gibbs as Rosé Westbrook (season 1, 3), a former Soul Train dancer caught up in Jamal's hidden treasure scheme. Former best friend of Stacy, aka Cuchillos, leader of the Santos.
 Shoshana Bush as Amber (season 2; guest season 4), Mario's girlfriend.
 Ada Luz Pla as Cuchillos (season 3), the leader of the Santos before her death
Mallory James Mahoney as Ainsley Riches (season 3)
 Gilberto Ortiz as Cuete (season 3-4), a 19th Street gang member
 Troy Leigh-Anne Johnson as Kendra (season 3; guest season 4), Jamal's love interest
 Ian Casselberry as Ray (season 3-4), Cesar and Spooky's father. Former Santos gang member before going to prison when Cesar and Spooky were kids. Worked at Dwayne's Joint after his release.
 Nikki Rodriguez as Vero (season 4), Cesar's girlfriend
 Andrea Cortés as Isabel (season 4), Oscar's wife

Episodes

Series overview

Season 1 (2018)

Season 2 (2019)

Season 3 (2020)

Season 4 (2021)

Reception

Critical response
Review aggregator Rotten Tomatoes gave the first season an approval rating of 95% based on 22 reviews, and a weighted average rating of 7.83/10. The website's critics consensus reads, "Charming, realistic, and focused on underrepresented communities, On My Block is the respite from stylized teen dramas you didn't know you needed.". Metacritic, which uses a weighted average, assigned a score of 69 out of 100 based on 5 critics, indicating "generally favorable reviews". Trey Mangum of Shadow and Act wrote, "On My Block is different than anything we've seen on television in relation to the experience of growing up. The stars are young people of color, dealing with real issues that happen in communities that they have to wrangle with during this pivotal time in their lives. For a lovely story about friendship and timely societal issues, along with superb youth acting, here is your next binge." Alexis Gunderson of Paste said, "When the final credits hit, it's clear that not one second of the season's 10 short episodes was wasted: Every line was measured out, every background track meticulously calibrated, every initially jarring tonal shift set up precisely for a singular cumulative effect that lands in the season's final moments like a punch to the chest you realize too late you should have seen coming from a mile away." Matt Seitz of New York Magazine wrote, "One of the many remarkable things about this series is how it folds crime and the awareness of potential violence into everyday life, which is something white sitcoms never do unless it's a Very Special Episode."

The second season has a 100% approval rating on Rotten Tomatoes, based on 9 reviews, with an average rating of 7.9/10. The third season holds an approval rating of 91% approval rating on Rotten Tomatoes, based on 11 reviews, with an average rating of 8/10. The website's critics consensus states, "On My Block still rings true in a buoyant third season that interweaves joy and peril with the series' signature authenticity."

Awards and nominations

Spin-off

On September 27, 2021, a spin-off of On My Block, titled as Freeridge was ordered to series by Netflix. It is created by Lauren Iungerich, Eddie Gonzalez, Jeremy Haft, Jamie Uyeshiro, and Jamie Dooner. It was announced in October 2021 that the series would star Bryana Salaz, Keyla Monterroso Mejia, Ciara Riley Wilson and Shiv Pai. The series premiered on February 2, 2023.

References

External links

2010s American comedy-drama television series
2010s American high school television series
2010s American teen drama television series
2020s American comedy-drama television series
2020s American high school television series
2020s American teen drama television series
2018 American television series debuts
2021 American television series endings
Hispanic and Latino American television
English-language Netflix original programming
Television series about teenagers
Television shows set in Los Angeles
Spanish-language Netflix original programming